P. K. Abdul Gafoor founded the Muslim Educational Society.

He was a medical doctor by profession and served as a Professor of Medicine at Calicut Medical College.

Historian M. G. S. Narayanan opined on him as "one of tallest leaders of the Muslim community to take note of economic weakness of a large section of the community and make strenuous efforts towards their progress". The Annual Dr. P M A Gafoor Memorial Lecture is held in his honour each year. The Dr. P K Abdul Gafoor Memorial Cultural Complex at Kaloor, Cochin housing the Cochin Stock Exchange is also named in his honour.

References

Year of birth missing
1984 deaths
Educators from Kerala
People from Kozhikode